Nassir Abo-Jalas (born June 11, 1994) is a Saudi Arabian professional basketball player.  He currently plays for Uhud Medina of the Saudi Premier League.

He represented Saudi Arabia's national basketball team at the 2017 Arab Nations Basketball Championship in Egypt. There, he was his team's top scorer.

Further, he represented Saudi Arabia's national 3x3 team at the 2013 FIBA Asia 3x3 Championship in Doha, Qatar, where he led his team to win the silver medal.

References

External links
 Asia-basket.com Profile
 FIBA Archive Profile

1994 births
Living people
Forwards (basketball)
Saudi Arabian men's basketball players
People from Medina
20th-century Saudi Arabian people
21st-century Saudi Arabian people